Gerald Kavanagh, known as Gerald of Ferns, was King of Leinster from 1518 to 1522, when his son Morogh succeeded him. His father was Art Óg mac Murchadha Caomhánach, who was a king of Ireland and King of Leinster.

References

 
Kings of Leinster
16th-century Irish monarchs
People from County Wexford
Year of birth unknown 
Year of death unknown 
15th-century births
16th-century deaths